Sir Thomas Reade (1782 – 1 August 1849) was a British army officer during the Napoleonic Wars, known also as a collector.

In 1799, at the age of sixteen, he ran away from home to enlist in the army and participate in campaigns in Holland, Egypt and America, as well as postings across Europe. Reade was also a scholar and antiquarian and collected a range of artefacts, much of which are held in the British Museum today.

He married Agnes Clogg on 8 September 1824. 

He was appointed consul general in Tunis on 10 May 1836, and died at his residence there on 1 August 1849. Reade was also responsible for seriously damaging the Libyco-Punic Mausoleum of Dougga in 1842 for the purposes of stealing the monument's Libyco-Punic inscription. The team commissioned to remove the inscription did it in such a maladroit way that the two upper floors of the mausoleum collapsed as a result.

He is buried (or has a memorial) in Congleton Parish Church with a tomb sculpted by Thomas Gaffin.Dictionary of British Sculptors 1660-1851 by Rupert Gunnis p.160

References
 

1782 births
1849 deaths
British Army officers
People from Congleton